George Braxton, Sr. (1677-July 1, 1748) emigrated from England or Wales to the Virginia colony, where he became a merchant, planter and politician in King and Queen County, which he represented in the House of Burgesses for multiple terms over 31 years. His son and principal heir George Braxton, Jr. also served in the House of Burgesses, but his most notable descendant (who was 12 when this grandfather died) was Carter Braxton, who became a Founding Father of the United States.

Career

Braxton owned 2825 acres in King and Queen County by 1704. His main plantation was Newington, on the bluffs above the Mattaponi River about 18 miles upstream from West Point, the county seat at the stream's confluence with the York River. He became one of the largest landowners in the Northern Neck of Virginia and probably one of the 100 largest in the colony. He and his namesake son also owned a ship, "Braxton", and leased others to carry on a triangular trade with the West Indies and Britain. About once a year, the Braxtonx served as commission agents for cargoes of enslaved Blacks.

Braxton accepted the governor's appointment as colonel of the King and Queen county militia, as well as coroner and one of the justices of the peace who collectively administered the county. He probably also served on the vestry of St. Stephen's parish (which also were responsible for care of the poor and disabled), although its records did not survive.

King and Queen county voters first elected Braxton as one of their two representatives in the House of Burgesses in 1718, and he served (with a gap) for about three decades. Beginning in 1728, Braxton served alongside John Robinson, who would become the family's major benefactor, although a scandal erupted after his death. Braxton also served on the select committee that assisted the governor in building the Governor's Palace in Williamsburg.

Personal life

By 1702, Braxton had marreid Elizabeth Pallin, daughter of planter Thomas Paullin. Both husband and wife signed the loyalty assurance of 1702 to the dying king. They had a son, George Braxton Jr. (who was attending the College of William and Mary by 1720) and daughters Hannah and Elizabeth who reached adulthood. Hannah married Philemon Bird and after his death Thomas Price of nearby Middlesex County. Elizabeth married Col. Humphrey Brooke of King William County, whose surveyor brother Robert Brooke accompanied the Knights of the Golden Horseshoe on their western excursion to the Blue Ridge Mountains. Their son George Brooke would become Treasurer of Virginia.

Death and legacy

Braxton died on July 1, 1748 and was probably buried at his Newington plantation. A memorial plaque at Mattaponi Church (which in his day was the Lower Church of St. Stephen's parish and rebuilt in 1730-1734) honors his service.
Although his son George Braxton Jr. was his principal heir, when his grandson George Braxton III died in 1761, most of the family properties (by then subject to significant debts) were inherited by Carter Braxton.

References

House of Burgesses members

1677 births
1748 deaths
People from King and Queen County, Virginia